In physics, specifically in quantum mechanics, a coherent state is the specific quantum state of the quantum harmonic oscillator, often described as a state which has dynamics most closely resembling the oscillatory behavior of a classical harmonic oscillator. It was the first example of quantum dynamics when Erwin Schrödinger derived it in 1926, while searching for solutions of the Schrödinger equation that satisfy the correspondence principle. The quantum harmonic oscillator (and hence the coherent states) arise in the quantum theory of a wide range of physical systems. For instance, a coherent state describes the oscillating motion of a particle confined in a quadratic potential well (for an early reference, see e.g.
Schiff's textbook). The coherent state describes a state in a system for which the ground-state wavepacket is displaced from the origin of the system. This state can be related to classical solutions by a particle oscillating with an amplitude equivalent to the displacement.

These states, expressed as eigenvectors  of the lowering operator and forming an overcomplete family, were introduced in the early papers of John R. Klauder, e. g. 
In the quantum theory of light (quantum electrodynamics) and other bosonic quantum field theories, coherent states were introduced by the work of Roy J. Glauber in 1963 and are also known as Glauber states.

The concept of coherent states has been considerably abstracted; it has become a major topic in mathematical physics and in applied mathematics, with applications ranging from  quantization to signal processing and image processing (see Coherent states in mathematical physics). For this reason, the coherent states associated to the quantum harmonic oscillator are sometimes referred to as canonical coherent states (CCS), standard coherent states, Gaussian states, or oscillator states.

Coherent states in quantum optics 

In quantum optics the coherent state refers to a state of the quantized electromagnetic field, etc. that describes a maximal kind of coherence and a classical kind of behavior.  Erwin Schrödinger derived it as a "minimum uncertainty" Gaussian wavepacket in 1926,  searching for solutions of the Schrödinger equation that satisfy the correspondence principle.  It is a minimum uncertainty state, with the single free parameter chosen to make the relative dispersion (standard deviation in natural dimensionless units) equal for position and momentum, each being equally small at high energy.

Further, in contrast to the energy eigenstates of the system, the time evolution of a coherent state is concentrated along the classical trajectories. The quantum linear harmonic oscillator, and hence coherent states, arise in the quantum theory of a wide range of physical systems.  They occur in the quantum theory of light (quantum electrodynamics) and other bosonic quantum field theories.

While minimum uncertainty Gaussian wave-packets had been well-known, they did not attract full attention until Roy J. Glauber, in 1963, provided a complete quantum-theoretic description of coherence in the electromagnetic field. In this respect, the concurrent contribution of E.C.G. Sudarshan should not be omitted, (there is, however, a note in Glauber's paper that reads: "Uses of these states as generating functions for the -quantum states have, however, been made by J. Schwinger).
Glauber was prompted to do this to provide a description of the Hanbury-Brown & Twiss experiment which generated very wide baseline (hundreds or thousands of miles) interference patterns that could be used to determine stellar diameters.  This opened the door to a much more comprehensive understanding of coherence.   (For more, see Quantum mechanical description.)

In classical optics, light is thought of as electromagnetic waves radiating from a source. Often, coherent laser light is thought of as light that is emitted by many such sources that are in phase. Actually, the picture of one photon being in-phase with another is not valid in quantum theory.  Laser radiation is produced in a resonant cavity where the resonant frequency of the cavity is the same as the frequency associated with the atomic electron transitions providing energy flow into the field.  As energy in the resonant mode builds up, the probability for stimulated emission, in that mode only, increases.  That is a positive feedback loop in which the amplitude in the resonant mode increases exponentially until some non-linear effects limit it.  As a counter-example, a light bulb radiates light into a continuum of modes, and there is nothing that selects any one mode over the other. The emission process is highly random in space and time (see thermal light). In a laser, however, light is emitted into a resonant mode, and that mode is highly coherent. Thus, laser light is idealized as a coherent state. (Classically we describe such a state by an electric field oscillating as a stable wave.  See Fig.1)

Besides describing lasers, coherent states also behave in a convenient manner when describing the quantum action of beam splitters: two coherent-state input beams will simply convert to two coherent-state beams at the output with new amplitudes given by classical electromagnetic wave formulas; such a simple behaviour does not occur for other input states, including number states. Likewise if a coherent-state light beam is partially absorbed, then the remainder is a pure coherent state with a smaller amplitude, whereas partial absorption of non-coherent-state light produces a more complicated statistical mixed state. Thermal light can be described as a statistical mixture of coherent states, and the typical way of defining nonclassical light is that it cannot be described as a simple statistical mixture of coherent states.

The energy eigenstates of the linear harmonic oscillator (e.g., masses on springs, lattice vibrations in a solid, vibrational motions of nuclei in molecules, or oscillations in the electromagnetic field) are fixed-number quantum states.  The Fock state (e.g. a single photon) is the most particle-like state; it has a fixed number of particles, and phase is indeterminate. A coherent state distributes its quantum-mechanical uncertainty equally between the canonically conjugate coordinates, position and momentum, and the relative uncertainty in phase [defined heuristically] and amplitude are roughly equal—and small at high amplitude.

Quantum mechanical definition

Mathematically, a coherent state  is defined to be the (unique) eigenstate of the annihilation operator  with corresponding eigenvalue . Formally, this reads,

Since  is not hermitian,  is, in general, a complex number.

The state  is called a canonical coherent state in the literature, since there are many other types of  coherent states, as can be seen in the companion article Coherent states in mathematical physics.

Physically, this formula means that a coherent state remains unchanged by the annihilation of field excitation or, say, a particle. An eigenstate of the annihilation operator has a Poissonian number distribution when expressed in a basis of energy eigenstates, as shown below.  A Poisson distribution is a necessary and sufficient condition that all detections are statistically independent. Contrast this to a single-particle state ( Fock state): once one particle is detected, there is zero probability of detecting another.

(See Nondimensionalization.) These operators are related to the position and momentum operators of a mass  on a spring with constant ,

For an optical field, 

are the real and imaginary components of the mode of the electric field inside a cavity of volume .

With these (dimensionless) operators, the Hamiltonian of either system becomes

Erwin Schrödinger was searching for the most classical-like states when he first introduced minimum uncertainty Gaussian wave-packets.

or, equivalently,

and hence 

Using the notation for multi-photon states, Glauber characterized the state of complete coherence to all orders in the electromagnetic field to be the eigenstate of the annihilation operator—formally, in a mathematical sense, the same state as found by Schrödinger.  The name coherent state took hold after Glauber's work.

The coherent state's location in the complex plane (phase space) is centered at the position and momentum of a classical oscillator of the phase  and amplitude |α| given by the eigenvalue α (or the same complex electric field value for an electromagnetic wave).  As shown in Figure 5, the uncertainty, equally spread in all directions, is represented by a disk with diameter .  As the phase varies, the coherent state circles around the origin and the disk neither distorts nor spreads. This is the most similar a quantum state can be to a single point in phase space.

Moreover, since the vacuum state  is just the coherent state with =0, all coherent states have the same uncertainty as the vacuum. Therefore, one may interpret the quantum noise of a coherent state as being due to  vacuum fluctuations.

The notation   does not refer to a Fock state. For example, when , one should not mistake  for the single-photon Fock state, which is also denoted  in its own notation. The expression  with  represents a Poisson distribution of number states  with a mean photon number of unity.

The formal solution of the eigenvalue equation is the vacuum state displaced to a location   in phase space, i.e., it is obtained by letting the unitary displacement operator  operate on the vacuum,
,

This can be easily seen, as can virtually all results involving coherent states, using the representation of the coherent state in the basis of Fock states,

where  are energy (number) eigenvectors of the Hamiltonian 

For the corresponding Poissonian distribution, the probability of detecting  photons is

Similarly, the average photon number in a coherent state is 

and the variance is 
.

That is, the standard deviation of the number detected goes like the square root of the number detected. So in the limit of large , these detection statistics are equivalent to that of a classical stable wave.

These results apply to detection results at a single detector and thus relate to first order coherence (see degree of coherence).  However, for measurements correlating detections at multiple detectors, higher-order coherence is involved (e.g., intensity correlations, second order coherence, at two detectors). Glauber's definition of quantum coherence involves nth-order correlation functions (n-th order coherence) for all .  The perfect coherent state has all n-orders of correlation equal to 1 (coherent).  It is perfectly coherent to all orders.

The second-order correlation coefficient  gives a direct measure of the degree of coherence of photon states in terms of the variance of the photon statistics in the beam under study.

In Glauber's development, it is seen that the coherent states are distributed according to a Poisson distribution. In the case of a Poisson distribution, the variance is equal to the mean, i.e. 

.

A second-order correlation coefficient of 1 means that photons in coherent states are uncorrelated.

Hanbury Brown and Twiss studied the correlation behavior of photons emitted from a thermal, incoherent source described by Bose–Einstein statistics.  The variance of the Bose-Einstein distribution is 

.

This corresponds to the correlation measurements of Hanbury Brown and Twiss, and illustrates that photons in incoherent Bose-Einstein states are correlated or bunched.

Quanta that obey Fermi-Dirac statistics are anti-correlated.  In this case the variance is

.

Anti-correlation id characterized by a second-order correlation coefficient =0.

Roy J. Glauber's work was prompted by the results of Hanbury-Brown and Twiss that produced long-range (hundreds or thousands of miles) first-order interference patterns through the use of intensity fluctuations (lack of second order coherence), with narrow band filters (partial first order coherence) at each detector.  (One can imagine, over very short durations, a near-instantaneous interference pattern from the two detectors, due to the narrow band filters, that dances around randomly due to the shifting relative phase difference.  With a coincidence counter, the dancing interference pattern would be stronger at times of increased intensity [common to both beams], and that pattern would be stronger than the background noise.)  Almost all of optics had been concerned with first order coherence.  The Hanbury-Brown and Twiss results prompted Glauber to look at higher order coherence, and he came up with a complete quantum-theoretic description of coherence to all orders in the electromagnetic field (and a quantum-theoretic description of signal-plus-noise).  He coined the term coherent state and showed that they are produced when a classical electric current interacts with the electromagnetic field.

At  ,  from Figure 5, simple geometry gives Δθ |α | = 1/2. 
From this,  it appears that there is a tradeoff between number uncertainty and phase uncertainty,  Δθ  Δn  = 1/2,  which is sometimes interpreted as a 
number-phase uncertainty relation; but  this is not a formal strict uncertainty relation: there is no uniquely defined phase operator in quantum mechanics.

The wavefunction of a coherent state

To find the wavefunction of the coherent state, the minimal uncertainty Schrödinger wave packet, it is easiest to start with the Heisenberg picture of the quantum harmonic oscillator for the coherent state .  Note that
 

The coherent state is an eigenstate of the annihilation operator in the Heisenberg picture.

It is easy to see that, in the Schrödinger picture, the same eigenvalue 
 
occurs,
  .

 
which is easily solved to yield
 
where  is a yet undetermined phase, to be fixed by demanding that the wavefunction satisfies the Schrödinger equation.

It follows that
 
so that  is the initial phase of the eigenvalue.

The mean position and momentum of this "minimal Schrödinger wave packet"  are thus oscillating just like a classical system, 

The probability density remains a Gaussian centered on this oscillating mean,

Mathematical features of the canonical coherent states
The canonical  coherent states described so far  have three properties that are mutually equivalent, since each of them completely specifies the state , namely,
 They are eigenvectors of the annihilation operator:   .
 They are obtained from the vacuum by application of a unitary displacement operator:    .

Each of these properties may  lead to generalizations, in general different from each other (see the article "Coherent states in mathematical physics" for some of these). We emphasize that coherent states have mathematical features  that are very different from those
of a Fock state; for instance, two different coherent states are not orthogonal,

(linked to the fact that they are eigenvectors of the non-self-adjoint annihilation operator ).

Thus,  if the oscillator is in the quantum state  it is also with nonzero probability in the other quantum state 
  (but the farther apart the states are situated in phase space, the lower the probability is). However, since they obey a closure relation, any state can be decomposed on the set of coherent states. They hence form an overcomplete basis, in which one can diagonally decompose any state. This is the premise for the Sudarshan-Glauber P representation.

This closure relation can be expressed by the resolution of the identity operator  in the vector space of quantum states,

This resolution of the identity is intimately connected to the Segal–Bargmann transform.

Another peculiarity is that   has no eigenket (while  has no eigenbra). The following equality is the closest formal substitute, and turns out to be useful for technical computations,

This last state is known as an "Agarwal state" or photon-added coherent state and denoted as 

Normalized Agarwal states of order  can be expressed as 

The above resolution of the identity may be derived (restricting to one spatial dimension for simplicity) by taking matrix elements between eigenstates of position, on both sides of the equation. On the right-hand side, this immediately gives .  On the left-hand side, the same is obtained by inserting 

In particular, the Gaussian Schroedinger wavepacket state follows from the explicit value 

The resolution of the identity may also be expressed in terms of particle position and momentum.
For each coordinate dimension (using an adapted notation with new meaning for ), 

the closure relation of coherent states reads

This can be inserted in any quantum-mechanical expectation value, relating it to some
quasi-classical phase-space integral and explaining, in particular, the origin of
normalisation factors  for classical 
partition functions, consistent with quantum 
mechanics.

In addition to being an exact eigenstate of annihilation operators, a coherent state is 
an approximate common eigenstate of particle position and momentum. Restricting to 
one dimension again, 

The error in these approximations is measured by the uncertainties 
of position and momentum,

Thermal coherent state

A single mode thermal coherent state is produced by displacing a thermal mixed state in phase space, in direct analogy to the displacement of the vacuum state in view of generating a coherent state. The density matrix of a coherent thermal state  in operator representation reads

The partition function is equal to

Using the expansion of the identity operator in Fock states, the density operator definition can be expressed in the following form

where  stands for the displaced Fock state. We remark that if temperature goes to zero we have

which is the density matrix for a coherent state. The average number of photons in that state can be calculated as below

where for the last term we can write

As a result, we find

where  is the average of the photon number calculated with respect to the thermal state. Here we have defined, for ease of notation,

and we write explicitly

In the limit   we obtain , which is consistent with the expression for the density matrix operator at zero temperature. Likewise, the photon number variance can be evaluated as

We deduce that the second moment cannot be uncoupled to the thermal and the quantum distribution moments, unlike the average value (first moment). In that sense, the photon statistics of the displaced thermal state is not described by the sum of the Poisson statistics and the Boltzmann statistics. The distribution of the initial thermal state in phase space broadens as a result of the coherent displacement.

Coherent states of Bose–Einstein condensates 

 A Bose–Einstein condensate (BEC) is a collection of boson atoms that are all in the same quantum state.  In a thermodynamic system, the ground state becomes macroscopically occupied below a critical temperature — roughly when the thermal de Broglie wavelength is longer than the interatomic spacing. Superfluidity in liquid Helium-4 is believed to be associated with the Bose–Einstein condensation in an ideal gas.  But 4He has strong interactions, and the liquid structure factor (a 2nd-order statistic) plays an important role.  The use of a coherent state to represent the superfluid component of 4He provided a good estimate of the condensate / non-condensate fractions in superfluidity, consistent with results of slow neutron scattering. Most of the special superfluid properties follow directly from the use of a coherent state to represent the superfluid component — that acts as a macroscopically occupied single-body state with well-defined amplitude and phase over the entire volume.  (The superfluid component of 4He goes from zero at the transition temperature to 100% at absolute zero. But the condensate fraction is about 6% at absolute zero temperature, T=0K.)
 Early in the study of superfluidity, Penrose and Onsager proposed a metric ("order parameter") for superfluidity.  It was represented by a macroscopic factored component (a macroscopic eigenvalue) in the first-order reduced density matrix.  Later, C. N. Yang proposed a more generalized measure of macroscopic quantum coherence, called "Off-Diagonal Long-Range Order" (ODLRO), that included fermion as well as boson systems.  ODLRO exists whenever there is a macroscopically large factored component (eigenvalue) in a reduced density matrix of any order.  Superfluidity corresponds to a large factored component in the first-order reduced density matrix.  (And, all higher order reduced density matrices behave similarly.)  Superconductivity involves a large factored component in the 2nd-order ("Cooper electron-pair") reduced density matrix.
 The reduced density matrices used to describe macroscopic quantum coherence in superfluids are formally the same as the correlation functions used to describe orders of coherence in radiation.  Both are examples of macroscopic quantum coherence.  The macroscopically large coherent component, plus noise, in the electromagnetic field, as given by Glauber's description of signal-plus-noise, is formally the same as the macroscopically large superfluid component plus normal fluid component in the two-fluid model of superfluidity.
 Every-day electromagnetic radiation, such as radio and TV waves, is also an example of near coherent states (macroscopic quantum coherence).  That should "give one pause" regarding the conventional demarcation between quantum and classical.
 The coherence in superfluidity should not be attributed to any subset of helium atoms; it is a kind of collective phenomena in which all the atoms are involved (similar to Cooper-pairing in superconductivity, as indicated in the next section).

Coherent electron states in superconductivity 
Electrons are fermions, but when they pair up into Cooper pairs they act as bosons, and so can collectively form a coherent state at low temperatures.  This pairing is not actually between electrons, but in the states available to the electrons moving in and out of those states. Cooper pairing refers to the first model for superconductivity.
These coherent states are part of the explanation of effects such as the Quantum Hall effect in low-temperature superconducting semiconductors.

Generalizations

According to Gilmore and Perelomov, who showed it independently, the construction of coherent states may be seen as a problem in group theory, and thus coherent states may be associated to groups different from the Heisenberg group, which leads to the canonical coherent states discussed above. Moreover, these coherent states may be generalized to quantum groups. These topics, with references to original work, are discussed in detail in Coherent states in mathematical physics.

In quantum field theory and string theory, a generalization of coherent states to the case where infinitely many degrees of freedom are used to define a vacuum state with a different vacuum expectation value from the original vacuum.
In one-dimensional many-body quantum systems with fermionic degrees of freedom, low energy excited states can be approximated as coherent states of a bosonic field operator that creates particle-hole excitations. This approach is called bosonization.
The Gaussian coherent states of nonrelativistic quantum mechanics can be generalized to relativistic coherent states of Klein-Gordon and Dirac particles.
Coherent states have also appeared in works on loop quantum gravity or for the construction of (semi)classical canonical quantum general relativity.

See also 
Coherent states in mathematical physics
Quantum field theory
Quantum optics
Quantum amplifier
Electromagnetic field
Degree of coherence

External links 
 Quantum states of the light field
 Glauber States: Coherent states of Quantum Harmonic Oscillator
 Measure a coherent state with photon statistics interactive

References 

Quantum states